Sisi Chen (December 28, 1938 – October 7, 2007), born Chen Limei, was a Chinese film and theater actress.

Biography
Born in Shanghai, China, she was best known for her portrayal of Qiu Xiang in Three Charming Smiles (San Xiao), a 1964 comedy.

Death
Sisi Chen was diagnosed with pancreatic cancer in July 2007. She died three months later, on 7 October 2007, aged 69, at Huadong Hospital in her native Shanghai.

Filmography

TV series
The Legend of the Condor Heroes (1976)

Films
Gold Diggers (1965) Dog Day Afternoon (1975)

References

External links

1938 births
2007 deaths
Deaths from cancer in the People's Republic of China
Chinese film actresses
Chinese stage actresses
Deaths from pancreatic cancer
Chinese television actresses
Actresses from Shanghai